This is a list of railway towns in the United States listed by state. The United States has a high concentration of railway towns, communities that developed and/or were built around a railway system. Railway towns are particularly abundant in the midwest and western states, and the railroad has been credited as a major force in the economic and geographic development of the country. Historians credit the railroad system for the country's vast development in the nineteenth and twentieth centuries, as well as having helped facilitate a "unified" nation.

Alabama
 Birmingham

Alaska
Fairbanks
Seward

Arizona
Benson
Williams

California

Colorado
 Antonito
 Denver
 Durango
 Pueblo

Georgia
 Atlanta (est. as Terminus)

Idaho
 Avery
 Burke
 Nampa
 Wallace

Illinois
 Centralia
 Champaign
 Chicago
 West Chicago

Iowa
 Ames

Kansas
Dodge City

Kentucky
Midway

Maryland
Baltimore
Brunswick
Cumberland
Hagerstown

Missouri
Kansas City
St. Louis

Montana
 Billings
 Dillon
 Laurel
 Livingston

Nebraska
North Platte
Omaha

Nevada
Carson City
Las Vegas
Virginia City

New Hampshire
 Woodsville

New Mexico
 Albuquerque
 Chama

New York
Albany
New York City

North Carolina
Apex
Ellenboro

North Dakota
 Barton
 Enderlin

Oklahoma
Guthrie
Stillwater

Oregon

Pennsylvania
 Altoona
 Pittsburgh
 Scranton

Tennessee
 Chattanooga
 Etowah
 Nashville

Texas
Port Arthur
Wills Point

Elgin, Texas

Utah
 Helper
 Salt Lake City

Vermont
 Island Pond
 White River Junction
 Wells River

Virginia
 Clifton Forge, home to Chesapeake & Ohio (C&O) shops.
 Roanoke, home to shops and locomotive works of the Norfolk & Western (N&W).
 Victoria, home to the Virginian Railway (VGN) shops.

Washington (state)
 Kalama
 Lester
 Melmont
 Spokane
 Tacoma

West Virginia
Wheeling
Harper's Ferry
Huntington, founded as terminus for Chesapeake & Ohio

Wyoming
 Cheyenne, Wyoming
 Laramie

References

External links
History of railroad towns via University of Groningen

Lists of towns in the United States